The George Cross is a UK and commonwealth award for bravery.

George Cross may also refer to:
George Cross (Malta), the award of the George Cross to the island of Malta
Cross of St. George, a Russian gallantry award
The Saint George's Cross, as a heraldic device and flag design

People named George Cross
George Cross (actor) (c. 1873–1949), Australian actor and casting director
George A. M. Cross (born 1942), British molecular parasitologist
George Lynn Cross (1905–1998), American biologist and university president
George W. Cross (1872–?), American politician, Missouri state representative
W. George Cross (born 1932), politician in Newfoundland, Canada
George H. Cross (1854–1946), member of the Wyoming Senate

Cross, George